The  114th Infantry Regiment is an Infantry regiment of the New Jersey Army National Guard.

Lineage 

Constituted 9 March 1869 in the New Jersey National Guard as the 5th Battalion.
Partially organized 14 April 1869 from existing units at Burlington and Camden
Expanded, reorganized, and redesignated 24 August 1870 as the 6th Regiment.
(Companies A, C, and G mustered into federal service 11–13 May 1898 at Sea Girt as Companies K, L, and M, 3d New Jersey Volunteer Infantry; mustered out of federal service 11 February 1899 at Athens, Georgia)
Reorganized and redesignated 2 May 1899 as the 3d Infantry.
Mustered into federal service 25 July 1917 at Sea Girt; drafted into federal service 5 August 1917.
Consolidated 11 October 1917 with elements of the 5th Infantry, New Jersey National Guard, and elements of the 1st Infantry, Delaware National Guard; consolidated unit reorganized and redesignated as the 114th Infantry and assigned to the 29th Division (Delaware elements withdrawn in January 1918—hereafter separate lineage)
Demobilized 14 May 1919 at Camp Dix, New Jersey
(Former 1st Battalion, 3d Infantry, reorganized in 1919 in the New Jersey National Guard as the 1st Battalion, 6th Infantry—hereafter separate lineage)
Former 3d Infantry (less 1st Battalion) reorganized in 1920 in the New Jersey National Guard; Headquarters federally recognized 23 December 1920 at Camden.
Redesignated 17 June 1921 as the 114th Infantry and assigned to the 44h Division (later redesignated as the 44th Infantry Division).
Inducted into federal service 16 September 1940 at home stations.
Inactivated 16 November 1945 at Camp Chaffee, Arkansas.
Relieved 9 July 1946 from assignment to the 44th Infantry Division.
Regiment (less 3d Battalion) reorganized and federally recognized 8 October 1946 as the 214th Infantry with headquarters at Paterson (3d Battalion, 114th Infantry, reorganized and federally recognized 17 February 1947 as the 114th Armored Infantry Battalion, with headquarters at Woodbury, and assigned to the 50th Armored Division).
(Location of Headquarters, 214th Infantry, changed 1 February 1947 to Newark)
214th Infantry reorganized and redesignated 15 May 1949 as the 216th Armored Infantry Battalion and assigned to the 50th Armored Division (remainder of 214th Infantry—hereafter separate lineage)
114th and 216th Armored Infantry Battalions consolidated 1 March 1959 and consolidated unit reorganized and redesignated as the 114th Infantry, a parent regiment under the Combat Arms Regimental System, to consist of the 1st and 2d Armored Infantry Battalions, elements of the 50th Armored Division.
Reorganized 31 January 1963 to consist of the 1st and 2d Battalions, elements of the 50th Armored Division.
Reorganized 1 February 1968 to consist of the 1st Battalion, an element of the 50th Armored Division.
Reorganized 1 July 1975 to consist of the 1st and 2d Battalions, elements of the 50th Armored Division.
Withdrawn 1 May 1989 from the Combat Arms Regimental System and reorganized under the United States Army Regimental System.
Reorganized 1 September 1991 to consist of the 1st Battalion, an element of the 50th Armored Division.
Reorganized 1 September 1993 to consist of the 1st Battalion, an element of the 42d Infantry Division.
Redesignated 1 October 2015 as the 1-114th Infantry Battalion (Air Assault), 50th Infantry Brigade Combat Team, 42nd Infantry Division.

Commanders 
2017 – 2020 LTC Kevin H. Welsh
2020 – 2021 LTC John T Boyd
2021 – 2022 LTC Timothy P Sorrentino
Note: Highest Rank Attained by Commander Listed

Command Sergeant Major 

2014 – 2016 CSM Thomas J. Clark
2016 – 2017 CSM Michael Colbert
2017 – 2018 CSM William Stuart
2018 – 2020 CSM Paul Horan
2020 – 2021 CSM Jacek K Niemynski
2021 – 2022 CSM John Rospond
2022 – Current CSM William Collier

Campaign participation

Civil War 
Headquarters Company (Woodbury), 1st Battalion, additionally entitled to:
Peninsula

Manassas
Fredericksburg

Chancellorsville

Gettysburg

Wilderness
Spotsylvania
Cold Harbor

Petersburg

Appomattox

Virginia 1864

World War I 
Meuse-Argonne

Alsace 1918

World War II 
Northern France

Rhineland

Ardennes-Alsace

Central Europe

World War II -- EAME 
Company B (Freehold) and Company D (Freehold), 1st Battalion, each additionally entitled to:
Normandy

War on Terrorism 
 Phase 5: Iraqi Surge
 Phase 6: Iraqi Sovereignty

Decorations 
Company B (Freehold) and Company D (Woodstown), 1st Battalion, each entitled to:
Presidential Unit Citation (Army), Streamer embroidered Hurtgen Forest
Belgian Fourragere 1940
Cited in the Order of the Day of the Belgian Army for action at Elsenborn Crest.
Cited in the Order of the Day of the Belgian Army for action in the Ardennes.

Decorations 
 Joint Meritorious Unit Award
Iraq (2008–2009)

Distinctive unit insignia 
 Description

Description/Blazon
A Gold color metal and enamel device 1 1/8 inches (2.86 cm) in height overall consisting of a shield blazoned: Argent, a saltire Azure, in chief a Taeguk of the last (Azure) and gray (the shoulder sleeve insignia of the 29th Division) and in base a four-leafed clover of the second (Azure) (the badge of the 3rd Division of the 2nd Corps, 1898). Attached above the shield from a wreath Argent and Azure a lion's head erased Or collared four fusils Gules. Attached below and to the sides of the shield a Gold scroll inscribed "IN OMNIA PARATUS" in Blue letters.
 Symbolism
The shield is white, the old Infantry color. The blue saltire cross represents service in the Civil War, the blue four-leafed clover in the Spanish–American War and the blue and gray Taeguk in World War I. The motto is the motto of the old 3rd New Jersey Infantry and translates to "Prepared in All Things."
 Background
The distinctive unit insignia was originally approved for the 114th Infantry Regiment on 29 May 1925. It was amended to correct the wording in the description of the shield on 11 June 1925. The insignia was amended to include the crest on 3 July 1961.

Coat of arms

Blazon 
 Shield
 Crest

Symbolism 
 Shield
The shield is blue for the Infantry; the white saltire cross commemorates the service of the old regiment in the Civil War and the silver oak tree the service in World War I (Argonne Forest).
 Crest
The crest is that of the New Jersey Army National Guard.

Background

References 
 Attribution

 References

New Jersey National Guard
Military units and formations established in 1869
United States Army regiments of World War I
Infantry regiments of the United States Army in World War II
114
1869 establishments in New Jersey
114